Haplogroup K2b1, known sometimes as haplogroup MS, is a human Y-DNA haplogroup, defined by SNPs P397 and P399. It has a complex, diverse and not-yet fully understood internal structure; its downstream descendants include the major haplogroups Haplogroup M (P256) and Haplogroup S (M230).

It is not clear at present whether the basal paragroup K2b1* is carried by any living males. Individuals carrying subclades of K2b1 are found primarily among Papuan peoples, Micronesian peoples, indigenous Australians, and Polynesians. It is also carried by Negrito and Melanesian minorities in The Philippines as well as Indonesia.

Structure

K2b1 is a direct descendant of K2b – known previously as Haplogroup MPS.

Its only primary branches are the major haplogroups S (B254), also known as K2b1a (and previously known as Haplogroup S1 or K2b1a4) and  M (P256), also known as K2b1b (previously K2b1d).

Distribution
K2b1 is strongly associated with the indigenous peoples of Melanesia (especially the island of New Guinea) and Micronesia, and to a lesser extent Polynesia, where it is generally found only among 5–10% of males. It is found in 83% of males in Papua New Guinea, and up to 60% in the Aeta of the Philippines. The vast majority of living males carrying K2b1 are members of downstream subclades within the major haplogroups M (also known as K2b1b) and S (K2b1a).

Studies of indigenous Australian Y-DNA published in 2014 and 2015, suggest that, before contact with Europeans, about 29% of Australian Aboriginal or Torres Strait Islander males belonged to downstream subclades of K2b1. That is, up to 27% indigenous Australian males carry haplogroup S1a1a1 (S-P308; previously known as  K2b1a1 or K-P308), and one study found that approximately 2.0% – i.e. 0.9% (11 individuals) of the sample in a study in which 45% of the total was deemed to be non-indigenous – belonged to haplogroup  M1 (M-M4; also known as M-M186 and known previously as haplogroup K2b1d1).  All of these males carrying M1 were Torres Strait Islanders. (The other Y-DNA haplogroups found were: basal K2* [K-M526], C1b2b [M347; previously Haplogroup C4], and basal C* [M130].)

References

Human genes
K2b1